BBC World News America is a British/American current affairs news program created by Garth Ancier and produced by the British Broadcasting Corporation's BBC News division, which premiered on October 1, 2007. Produced out of the BBC's Washington, D.C. bureau, Laura Trevelyan is the main presenter. Katty Kay – who originally appeared on the program through her role as a Washington-based correspondent for BBC News – served as the main presenter from 2011 to 2021, replacing original co-anchor Matt Frei.

The program is broadcast worldwide on BBC World News and, through an agreement with Washington's PBS member station, WETA-TV, is syndicated to PBS member stations and select non-commercial educational independent stations throughout the United States. Until June 2019, Los Angeles-based NCE station KCET handled this distribution.

From its debut until March 25, 2011, the program was one-hour long, airing as a simulcast on BBC America in the United States and BBC World News internationally, with the first half-hour (on tape delay) being shown overnights on the BBC News Channel in the United Kingdom. The program was reduced to a half-hour broadcast on March 28, 2011, and was removed from BBC America. On October 31, 2016, the program returned to the BBC News Channel after a five-year absence, and currently airs on the channel at 21:30 GMT for one week in November and one or two weeks in March between when the clocks change in the UK and the US.

From June 11 to July 26, 2018 Monday – Thursday, when BST was in effect, the first half-hour edition was temporarily broadcast for viewers around the world except in North and South America. Then from August 2018, the usual full-hour edition resumed global distribution.

Special broadcasts 
In some instances, the program had been cut off on its hour broadcast to a few snippets for breaking news events (e.g.: 2007 Karachi bombing). In the case of the 2008 US Election primaries & caucus, the program was extended to 3 hours (e.g.: 2008 Iowa Caucus) and even up to 6 hours (e.g.: 2008 Super Tuesday) and was only presented by one host. BBC World News America also covered the three presidential and the only vice-presidential debates.

Presenters

Former presenters 
 Laura Trevelyan (Main presenter, 2012–2023)
 Katty Kay (Main presenter, 2011–2021)
 Matt Frei (Main presenter, 2007–12)
 Philippa Thomas (Relief presenter, 2007–2009)
Rajini Vaidyanathan (Relief presenter)
Larry Madowo (Relief presenter, 2020–2021)

Awards 
 
BBC World News America has won several Peabody Awards. It won one in 2007 for White Horse Village. In 2010, BBC World News America was a recipient of two 69th Annual Peabody Awards. One award was given to the program, calling it a "Unique Broadcast, Unique Perspective", which was described as "A nightly newscast like none the United States has ever had, it places our actions and concerns in a global context." The second award was for the report Where Giving Life is a Death Sentence. The program won another Peabody Award in 2014 "for dedicating the necessary resources and risking their lives to give the world an up-close look at the horrors of the Syrian conflict" in Inside Syria's War.

Branding

References

External links 

BBC World News America (BBC News, 2007-2011)
 (2007-2012)
 BBC World News America at BBC America

BBC television news shows
BBC World News shows
Peabody Award-winning television programs
English-language television shows
2007 British television series debuts
2007 American television series debuts
2010s British television series
2000s American television news shows
2010s American television news shows
2020s American television news shows